The prime minister of the Independent State of Samoa is the head of government of Samoa. The prime minister is a member of the Legislative Assembly, and is appointed by the O le Ao o le Malo (Head of State) for a five-year term. Since independence in 1962, a total of seven individuals have served as prime minister. The incumbent was disputed due to the 2021 constitutional crisis, when Tuila'epa Sa'ilele Malielegaoi refused to accept the results of the 2021 general election. On 23 July 2021, the Samoan Court of Appeal ruled that the Faʻatuatua i le Atua Samoa ua Tasi (FAST) party had been in government since 24 May. Tuila'epa then conceded defeat, resulting in FAST party leader Fiamē Naomi Mataʻafa becoming prime minister.

History of the office

Colonial period 

The first prime minister during the colonial period was Albert Barnes Steinberger, who originally represented the American government in the Samoan Islands but was close to German commercial interests. After the indigenous authorities of the islands adopted the Constitution of 1873, Steinberger was appointed Prime Minister by King Malietoa Laupepa in July 1875. He held this post for seven months before the British and American consuls in the country persuaded Laupepa to dismiss him, seeing his role as German interference in the islands. Over the next two decades, there was no prime minister in the country, and in 1899 Samoa fell under the colonial rule of the Western powers, being divided as a German colony and an American colony at the end of the Second Samoan Civil War, according to the terms of the Tripartite Convention.

At the beginning of the World War I, German Samoa was occupied by New Zealand in 1914, and was subsequently organized as a trust territory of New Zealand in 1920.

Post-independence period 

The position of prime minister replaced the office of the leader of government business in 1959, whilst the country was a territory of New Zealand. High chief Fiamē Mataʻafa Faumuina Mulinuʻu II became Samoa’s first prime minister on 1 October 1959.

After Samoa (then known as Western Samoa) gained independence on 1 January 1962, the prime minister's office remained intact, and the premiership of Fiamē Mata’afa continued. The head of state, or O le Ao o le Malo (initially held by two individuals), was established as a ceremonial office. In 1991, the legislative assembly passed a bill proposed by Prime Minister Tofilau Eti Alesana's Human Rights Protection Party (HRPP) to increase the parliamentary term (and hence the premiership) from three to five years. Which therefore extended the time a prime minister can serve without renewing their mandate.

From 24 May to 23 July 2021, the premiership was in dispute due to an inconclusive result from the 2021 general election and the subsequent constitutional crisis. The claimants were long-serving prime minister Tuila'epa Sa'ilele Malielegaoi of the HRPP, and Fiamē Naomi Mataafa of Faʻatuatua i le Atua Samoa ua Tasi (FAST), a former deputy prime minister and daughter of Fiamē Mataʻafa Faumuina Mulinuʻu II. On 23 July, the Supreme Court ruled that Fiamē Naomi’s FAST government was legitimate since 24 May. Tuila'epa conceded defeat on 26 July and ceded power the following day, resulting in Fiamē Naomi Mata‘afa becoming Samoa’s first female prime minister and ending nearly 35 years of HRPP rule.

Powers and appointment 
The Constitution, adopted in 1960 during the transitional period of autonomy, provides that the executive power is vested in the head of state (O le Ao o le Malo), elected by the Legislative Assembly, and who acts only on the recommendation of the government. The head of state has royal assent powers to sign bills into law and dissolve Parliament. Executive power is exercised by the prime minister and their cabinet. The prime minister is appointed by the head of state as a member of the Legislative Assembly who enjoys the confidence of a majority in the Legislative Assembly (Article 32 (2) (a)). The prime minister may be removed from office by the Legislative Assembly (Article 33 (1) (b)). Samoa is thus a parliamentary democracy based on the Westminster system.

List of officeholders 

Political parties

 

Other factions

Symbols

† Died in office

Prime Minister of the Kingdom of Samoa (1875–1876)

Prime Ministers of the Independent State of Samoa (1959–present)

Timeline

See also 

 Samoa
 Politics of Samoa
 List of colonial governors of Samoa
 O le Ao o le Malo
 Deputy Prime Minister of Samoa
 Lists of office-holders

Notes

References

External links 

 World Statesmen – Samoa

Politics of Samoa
Government of Samoa
Samoa, List of Prime Ministers of
 
1875 establishments in Oceania
Samoa politics-related lists
Lists of Samoan people